Srđan "Srđa" Knežević (Serbian Cyrillic: Срђан Срђа Кнежевић; born 15 April 1985) is a Serbian retired professional footballer who played as a defender.

Club career
Knežević came through the youth system of Partizan. He later went on loans to Teleoptik, Obilić and Bežanija in order to gain experience. In the summer of 2007, Knežević returned to Partizan, helping the club win three consecutive national championships (2008, 2009 and 2010). He subsequently moved to Polish club Legia Warsaw in May 2010.

In July 2014, Knežević joined Japanese club V-Varen Nagasaki.

International career
Knežević represented FR Yugoslavia at the 2002 UEFA European Under-17 Championship.

Honours
Partizan
 Serbian SuperLiga: 2007–08, 2008–09, 2009–10
 Serbian Cup: 2007–08, 2008–09
Legia Warsaw
 Polish Cup: 2010–11

References

External links
 
 
 
 

Agrotikos Asteras F.C. players
Association football defenders
Ekstraklasa players
Expatriate footballers in Bosnia and Herzegovina
Expatriate footballers in Greece
Expatriate footballers in Israel
Expatriate footballers in Japan
Expatriate footballers in Poland
First League of Serbia and Montenegro players
FK Bežanija players
FK Borac Banja Luka players
FK Novi Pazar players
FK Obilić players
FK Partizan players
FK Partizan non-playing staff
FK Rad players
FK Teleoptik players
OFK Žarkovo players
Football League (Greece) players
Footballers from Belgrade
Hapoel Acre F.C. players
Israeli Premier League players
Legia Warsaw players
OFK Beograd players
Serbia and Montenegro footballers
Serbian expatriate footballers
Serbian expatriate sportspeople in Bosnia and Herzegovina
Serbian expatriate sportspeople in Greece
Serbian expatriate sportspeople in Israel
Serbian expatriate sportspeople in Japan
Serbian expatriate sportspeople in Poland
Serbian footballers
Serbian SuperLiga players
V-Varen Nagasaki players
1985 births
Living people